Enångers IK is a Swedish football club located in Enånger.

Enångers IK currently plays in Division 4 Hälsingland which is the sixth tier of Swedish football. They play their home matches at the Brovallen in Enånger.

The club is affiliated to Hälsinglands Fotbollförbund.

Season to season

In the late 1960s Enångers IK competed in the following divisions:

In recent seasons Enångers IK have competed in the following divisions:

References

External links 
 Enångers IK - Official website

Football clubs in Gävleborg County